Black Fall is a collaborative extended play by American rappers Yelawolf and DJ Paul, hosted by DJ Whoo Kid. It was released free for download on October 31, 2013 through Slumerican and Shady Records. Production was handled solely by DJ Paul. The five-track mixtape features guest appearance from Rittz the Rapper.

Track listing
All tracks produced by DJ Paul and TWhy Xclusive, track 5 only produced by DJ Paul.

Sample credits
"Get Straight" samples "Here to Stay" by Korn.
"Mastermind" samples "Comfortably Numb" by Pink Floyd.
"Bowties" samples "For Whom the Bell Tolls" by Metallica.
"Party Prophet" samples "The Sign of the Southern Cross" by Black Sabbath.
"Light Switch" samples "Uprising" by Muse.

Personnel
Michael Wayne Atha – vocals
Paul Duane Beauregard – vocals (track 4), producer
Jonathan McCollum – vocals (track 3)
Yves Mondesir – host
Josh Winkler – design

References

External links
Black Fall on Discogs
Black Fall on Shady Records

2013 EPs
Yelawolf EPs
Shady Records EPs
Albums produced by DJ Paul
Albums free for download by copyright owner